Oculoauricular syndrome is a rare genetic condition affecting the eyes and ears. It is due to mutations in the H6 family homeobox 1 (HMX1) gene. It is also known as the Schorderet-Munier-Franceschetti syndrome.

Signs and symptoms

The clinical features of this condition are as follows:

Eyes
 microphthalmia
 coloboma
 nystagmus
 corneal sclerosis
 cataract
 glaucoma
 anterior synechiae
 posterior synechiae
 macular hypoplasia
 rod-cone dystrophy
 divergent strabismus
 posterior embryotoxon

Ears
 malformed pinnae
 low-set pinnae
 crumpled helix
 narrow external acoustic meatus
 coloboma of the lobules

Hearing is normal

Genetics

This condition is inherited in an autosomal recessive manner. The gene responsible is located on the short arm of chromosome 4 (4p16.1)

Pathogensis

This is not presently understood.

Diagnosis

Differential diagnosis

This includes
 Morning glory syndrome

Epidemiology

This condition has only been described in three families to date (2017).

History

This condition was first described in 1945. The gene responsible was identified in 2008.

References

External links 

Rare syndromes
Congenital disorders
Genetic diseases and disorders